The Detroit Eagles were a professional basketball team based in Detroit, Michigan. Managed by Dutch Dehnert, they played in the National Basketball League from 1939 to 1941, then became a barnstorming team. The team folded during the 1942–43 season after most of the roster had been drafted to serve in the military.

The Eagles won the 1941 World Professional Basketball Tournament in Chicago with a 39-37 victory over the Oshkosh All-Stars. They returned to the tournament in 1942, but this time lost to Oshkosh 43-41.

Notable players
Buddy Jeannette
Ed Sadowski
Press Maravich
Slim Wintermute

References

 
1939 establishments in Michigan
1941 disestablishments in Michigan
Basketball teams disestablished in 1941
Basketball teams established in 1939